Travis Howard Phelps (born July 25, 1977) is a former Major League Baseball pitcher. He played in Major League Baseball from - for the Tampa Bay Devil Rays and Milwaukee Brewers.

Playing career
Born in Rocky Comfort, Missouri, Phelps was drafted in the 89th round of the 1996 Major League Baseball Draft.

Phelps made his major league debut with the then Tampa Bay Devil Rays on April 19, 2001 when he pitched two scoreless innings in the Rays 8-3 loss to the Boston Red Sox. He would go on to make 49 appearances out of the Bullpen for the Rays that year and 26 more in 2002.
He last played in the majors in 2004 when he made 4 appearances for the Milwaukee Brewers, but would play for a number of years in the minors and independent leagues.

On January 6, Phelps signed a minor league contract with the Detroit Tigers, hoping to make it back to the major leagues. However, he was released by the Tigers at the end of spring training and signed with the York Revolution, with whom he had spent the previous season. He became a free agent at the end of the 2009 season and did not play for another professional team.

Coaching
Phelps was hired as the Staten Island Yankees pitching coach in 2016. Since becoming the Pitching coach the team has posted the lowest team ERA each season from 2016-2018.

References

External links

1977 births
Living people
Major League Baseball pitchers
Tampa Bay Devil Rays players
Milwaukee Brewers players
Baseball players from Missouri
Charleston RiverDogs players
Crowder Roughriders baseball players
Orlando Rays players
Durham Bulls players
Richmond Braves players
Indianapolis Indians players
Chattanooga Lookouts players
Louisville Bats players
Colorado Springs Sky Sox players
Iowa Cubs players
Huntsville Stars players
Round Rock Express players
Corpus Christi Hooks players
York Revolution players
Newark Bears players
Camden Riversharks players
Princeton Devil Rays players
St. Petersburg Devil Rays players